Myrmatheca is a genus of spiders in the family Salticidae. It was first described in 2016 by Prószyński. , it contains only one species, Myrmatheca alticephalon, found in Sumatra and Borneo.

References

Salticidae
Monotypic Salticidae genera
Spiders of Asia